Russell Township is located in Lawrence County, Illinois. As of the 2010 census, its population was 450 and it contained 223 housing units.  The township includes the village of Russellville on the Wabash River.

Geography

Demographics

References

External links
City-data.com
Illinois State Archives

Townships in Lawrence County, Illinois
Townships in Illinois